Plunging Hoofs is a 1929 American silent Western film directed by Henry MacRae and written by George Morgan and Gardner Bradford. The film stars Starlight the Horse, Rex the Wonder Horse, Jack Perrin, Barbara Worth, J. P. McGowan and David Dunbar. The film was released on April 10, 1929, by Universal Pictures.

Cast     
 Starlight the Horse as Starlight
 Rex the Wonder Horse as Rex
 Jack Perrin as Parson Jed Campbell
 Barbara Worth as Nanette
 J. P. McGowan as Jim Wales
 David Dunbar as 'Squint' Jones

References

External links
 

1929 films
1929 Western (genre) films
Universal Pictures films
Films directed by Henry MacRae
American black-and-white films
Silent American Western (genre) films
1920s English-language films
1920s American films